Scrosoppi FC is a Canadian semi-professional soccer club based in Milton, Ontario that plays in League1 Ontario. The club is named after St. Luigi Scrosoppi, who is the patron saint of footballers.

History

The club was founded in 2020, partnering with youth soccer clubs Milton Youth SC and Brampton SC. (As of 2022, Brampton SC no longer appears to be a partner club of Scrosoppi.) The name was chosen in honour of St. Luigi Scrosoppi, who is the patron saint of footballers.

The club joined League1 Ontario for the 2021 season. Their home field in their inaugural season is Bishop Reding Catholic Secondary School in Milton. They finished their inaugural season in fourth place in the Western Conference and also recorded their largest victory in team history that season, when they defeated Sigma FC by a score of 10-1.

In July 2022, Scrosoppi owner Gary Raulino purchased Portuguese fourth division club SC Vianense of the Campeonato de Portugal, bringing the club into their player pathway program, with the two teams set to serve as 'twin clubs'.

Seasons

Notable former players

References

Soccer clubs in Ontario
League1 Ontario teams
Milton, Ontario